Angolan Futsal Championship is the premier futsal league in Angola. The competition is run by the Campeonato Nacional de futebol salão under the auspices of the Federação Angolana de Futebol de Salão (FAFUSA).

List of champions
 1996:
 1997:
 1998:
 1999:
 2000:
 2001:
 2002:
 2003:
 2004: Rádio Nacional de Angola
 2005: Escholina Futuro da Nacion
 2006: Toyota de Angola Luanda
 2007: Toyota de Angola Luanda
 2008: Toyota de Angola Luanda
 2009: Toyota de Angola
 2010: Banco BIC Luanda
 2011: Toyota de Angola
 2012: Ente Nacional Energia (ENE)
 2013: Ente Nacional Energia (ENE)
 2014: ENE de Luanda
 2015: Clínica Sagrada Esperança
 2016: RNT de Luanda
 2017: RNT de Luanda
 2018: Coprat de Luanda
 2019:

See also
Angolan Futsal Cup

References

External links
Official website

Futsal competitions in Angola
futsal
1996 establishments in Angola
Angola
Sports leagues established in 1996